M. Cathleen Kaveny is an American legal scholar and theologian. She is the Darald and Juliet Libby Professor of Law and Theology at Boston College. She holds a joint appointment at both the Law School and Department of Theology at Boston College, the first person to hold a faculty appointment in two schools at that university.

Education
Kaveny has an A.B. from Princeton University and an M.A., M.Phil., J.D., and Ph.D. from Yale University.

Early career
She clerked for Judge John T. Noonan Jr. of the U.S. Court of Appeals for the Ninth Circuit and worked for a large firm in Boston.

Academic career
Kaveny has published over forty articles and essays, in journals and books specializing in law, ethics, and medical ethics. She has served on several editor boards, including The American Journal of Jurisprudence, The Journal of Religious Ethics, the Journal of Law and Religion, and The Journal of the Society of Christian Ethics. She was the John P. Murphy Foundation Professor of Law and Professor of Theology at the University of Notre Dame from 2001 to 2013 where she sat on the advisory board of the Erasmus Institute, created in 1997 to encourage religiously-based intellectual traditions in contemporary scholarship.  She became the Darald and Juliet Libby Professor of Law and Theology at Boston College, in Chestnut Hill, Massachusetts, in 2014.

On March 1, 2012, Kaveny was the guest on The Daily Show with Jon Stewart where she discussed the legal and theological issues surrounding the Catholic Church's position on contraception.

Publications
Her books include:

Law’s Virtues: Fostering Autonomy and Solidarity in American Society (2012)
A Culture of Engagement: Law, Religion, and Morality (2016)
Prophecy without Contempt: Religious Discourse in the Public Square (2016)
Ethics at the Edges of Law: Christian Moralists and American Legal Thought (2018)

References

External links
 Faculty page at Boston College

American legal scholars
Living people
Law and morality
Year of birth missing (living people)
Place of birth missing (living people)
Princeton University alumni
Yale University alumni
Boston College faculty